Yakacık, historically and still informally called Zıramba, is a village in the Oğuzeli District, Gaziantep Province, Turkey. The village is inhabited by Turkmens of various tribes, including Elbegli and Barak, as well as Abdals of the Maya Sekenler tribe.

References

Villages in Oğuzeli District